Shobha Gasti is based in Belgaum in the Indian state of Karnataka. She founded Mahila Abhivrudhi Mattu Samrakshana Samasthe (MASS) in 1997. It helps former Devadasi women in 360 villages in Karnataka to move forward in their lives. Having begun with 2,500 members, by 2014 it had 3,600 participants. MASS succeeded in securing pensions for former Devadasis who were over 45 years old. Gasti also promotes children's rights, working with groups such as Child Rights and You (CRY).

In recognition of her work, Gasti was given the 2021 Nari Shakti Puraskar by President Ram Nath Kovind in 2022.

References 

Year of birth missing (living people)
People from Belgaum
Indian women activists
Children's rights activists
Nari Shakti Puraskar winners
Living people